Yanac District is one of seven districts of the Corongo Province in Peru.

References

Districts of the Corongo Province
Districts of the Ancash Region